Eilema contempta is a moth of the  subfamily Arctiinae. It was described by Rothschild in 1924. It is found in Africa.

References

contempta
Moths described in 1924